1988 is the third studio album by American hip hop musician Blueprint. It was released on March 29, 2005, on Rhymesayers Entertainment.

Reception
At Metacritic, which assigns a weighted average score out of 100 to reviews from mainstream critics, 1988 received an average score of 83% based on 9 reviews, indicating "universal acclaim".

Track listing

References

External links
 
 

2005 albums
Blueprint (rapper) albums
Rhymesayers Entertainment albums